Ezhuthatha Sattangal is a 1984 Indian Tamil-language film directed by K. Shankar, starring Sivaji Ganesan, Jaishankar and M. N. Nambiar. It is a remake of the Malayalam film Aarambham (1982). The film was released on 15 August 1984.

Plot

Cast 

Sivaji Ganesan as Nazeer Vappa
Prabhu as Shankar
Jaishankar as Judge Thiyagarajan
M. N. Nambiar as the Farooq
Srividya
Nalini
Urvashi as Meena
Sarath Babu as Dr. Basheer
Rajesh
R. S. Manohar as Sebastian
Sivachandran as jambi
Thengai Srinivasan as velu
Oru Viral Krishna Rao
Nagaraja Chozhan
Anuradha
Vijayalakshmi
Vijayarekha
K. Vijayan in Guest appearance
V. Gopalakrishnan in guest appearance (DR. Abraham)
LIC Narasimhan

Soundtrack 
The soundtrack was composed by Ilaiyaraaja, with lyrics by Pulamaipithan.

References

External links 
 

1980 films
1980s Tamil-language films
1984 films
Fictional portrayals of the Tamil Nadu Police
Films directed by K. Shankar
Films scored by Ilaiyaraaja
Tamil remakes of Malayalam films